Gift of Love is a 1992 album by Sissel.

Gift of Love or The Gift of Love may also refer to:

Film and TV
The Gift of Love, 1958 film
Kadhal Parisu (English: Gift of Love), 1987 Tamil language film
A Gift of Love (1972 film), a 1972 Philippines film with Nora Aunor
The Gift of Love, 1978 made-for-TV movie with Marie Osmond
The Gift of Love: A Christmas Story, 1983 American made-for-television drama film
The Gift of Love (1994 film), 1994 TV film with Olivia Burnette
A Gift of Love, 1999 TV film with Debbie Reynolds

TV episodes
"The Gift of Love", 2017; Season 1, Episode 4; Are You the One: Second Chances
"Gift of Love", 1998 episode of Born Free
"A Gift of Love", 1965; Season 5, Episode 21; Dr. Kildare 
"Gift of Love", 1963; Season 4, Episode 22; Hawaiian Eye
"A Gift of Love", 1968; Season 2, Episode 6; Gentle Ben

Music

Albums
The Gift of Love (Jerry Butler album), 1968
Voice of Love, a Diana Ross album also released as Gift of Love
A Gift of Love, 2015 greatest hits album by Bette Midler, 2015 
A Gift of Love, 1993 album by Bill Tarmey
A Gift of Love, 1998 album of songs and poems of Rumi by Deepak Chopra and Adam Plack 
A Christmas Gift of Love, Barry Manilow album
Conception: The Gift of Love, 1979 album by American jazz vibraphonist Bobby Hutcherson
Gift of Love, 1962 album by Jack Jones
The Gift of Love, 2009 album by Phil Perry and Melba Moore
 The Gift of Love, 2020 album by Qwabe Twins

Songs
"Gift of Love", song by Hillsong Church from Songs for Communion 
"Gift of Love", single by David Ball from David Ball
"The Gift of Love", song by Stars from There Is No Love in Fluorescent Light
"The Gift of Love", a 1962 single by Jack Jones
"The Gift of Love", a song by Bette Midler from Some People's Lives
"The Gift of Love", song by Plácido Domingo from Christmas in Vienna
"The Gift of Love", B-side of "Nine Times Out of Ten" by Teddy Pendergrass from It's Time for Love
"The Gift of Love", song recorded by Sissel Kyrkjebø from Gift of Love

Other
A Gift of Love, permanent exhibit in Saint John Paul II National Shrine